Kevin James Kisner (born February 15, 1984) is an American professional golfer who plays on the PGA Tour.

Early life
Kisner was born in Aiken, South Carolina and attended South Aiken High School. He played college golf at the University of Georgia and was a member of their 2005 NCAA Division I Championship team along with Chris Kirk, Richard Scott, and Brendon Todd. After graduating in 2006, he turned professional.

Professional career
Kisner played on the mini-tours (NGA Hooters Tour and Tarheel Tour) from 2007 to 2009, winning three times. He also played in six Nationwide Tour events in 2009. He played the Nationwide Tour full-time in 2010, winning once at the Mylan Classic. He finished the year 11th on the money list and earned his 2011 PGA Tour card.

Kisner failed to earn enough money on the PGA Tour in 2011 to retain his card (181st on money list), but finished T-11 at qualifying school to earn his card for 2012. He again failed to retain his card, finishing 167th on the money list, and missed earning a card in qualifying school by one stroke. He returned to (the now renamed) Web.com Tour in 2013 and won the Chile Classic in March. He finished 13th on the 2013 Web.com Tour regular season money list to earn his 2014 PGA Tour card.

In 2014, Kisner finished sixth at the Wells Fargo Championship, eighth at the Wyndham Championship and ninth at the RBC Canadian Open.

During the 2015 PGA Tour, Kisner finished runner-up three times, losing all three in sudden-death playoffs. He was defeated at the 2015 RBC Heritage after losing on the second hole of the playoff to Jim Furyk. Kisner would go on to finish tied with Sergio García and Rickie Fowler at The Players Championship event in May after 72 holes, losing to Fowler on the first hole of sudden-death after the two remained tied following a three-hole aggregate playoff. At the Greenbrier Classic he again tied for second after losing a sudden-death playoff, which was eventually won by Danny Lee. Kisner was eliminated on the first extra hole with birdie. Other notable results were finishes for fourth at the McGladrey Classic, fifth at the Crowne Plaza Invitational at Colonial, and eighth at the Memorial Tournament.

Kisner finished as runner-up at the WGC-HSBC Champions event in Shanghai in November 2015, two strokes behind Russell Knox despite holding the 36-hole lead. This was Kisner's fourth runner-up finish of the 2015 calendar year.

On November 22, 2015, after a number of near misses, Kisner earned his first PGA Tour victory by winning the RSM Classic, in his 109th PGA Tour start. He won by six strokes over Kevin Chappell as he dominated the tournament over the weekend. He began the final round with a three stroke advantage and shot a final round of 64 to storm to his first victory. The win moved him into the Top 20 in the world rankings and put him at the top of the early FedEx Cup standings moving into 2016.

On May 28, 2017, Kisner won his second PGA Tour title at the Dean & DeLuca Invitational with a one-stroke victory over three other players.

On March 25, 2018, Kisner finished runner-up in the WGC-Dell Technologies Match Play in Austin, Texas. He lost to Bubba Watson in the final, 7 & 6. He also tied for second with a score of six-under-par at the 2018 Open Championship.

On March 31, 2019, Kisner once again reached the championship round of the WGC-Dell Technologies Match Play. This time, he won the tournament (3 & 2) over fellow American Matt Kuchar.

In August 2021, Kisner won the Wyndham Championship with a birdie on the second extra hole in a six-man sudden-death playoff.

In September 2022, Kisner was selected for the U.S. team in the 2022 Presidents Cup; he tied one and lost two of the three matches he played.

Charity
Kisner founded the Kisner Foundation with his wife, Brittany, to "support organizations that serve children in one or more of the following areas: child health, education, youth sports" in and around his hometown of Aiken, South Carolina.

Professional wins (10)

PGA Tour wins (4)

PGA Tour playoff record (1–5)

European Tour wins (1)

Web.com  Tour wins (2)

NGA Hooters Tour wins (1)
2008 Savannah Lakes Resort Classic

Tarheel Tour wins (2)
2007 Tarheel Tour Match Play
2008 Bermuda Run Open

Other wins (1)

Results in major championships
Results not in chronological order in 2020.

CUT = missed the half-way cut
"T" indicates a tie for a place
NT = No tournament due to COVID-19 pandemic

Summary

Most consecutive cuts made – 9 (2016 Masters – 2018 Masters)
Longest streak of top-10s – 1 (twice)

Results in The Players Championship

CUT = missed the halfway cut
"T" indicates a tie for a place
C = Canceled after the first round due to the COVID-19 pandemic

World Golf Championships

Wins (1)

Results timeline

1Cancelled due to COVID-19 pandemic

QF, R16, R32, R64 = Round in which player lost in match play
NT = no tournament
"T" = tied
Note that the Championship and Invitational were discontinued from 2022.

U.S. national team appearances
Professional
Presidents Cup: 2017 (winners), 2022 (winners)

See also
2010 Nationwide Tour graduates
2011 PGA Tour Qualifying School graduates
2013 Web.com Tour Finals graduates

References

External links

American male golfers
Georgia Bulldogs men's golfers
PGA Tour golfers
Korn Ferry Tour graduates
Golfers from South Carolina
Sportspeople from Aiken, South Carolina
1984 births
Living people